The 2010 season of the LNFA was the 16th season of top-tier American football in Spain. In the 2010 season the league expanded to 15 teams, divided into three conferences of five teams each. The Conferencia Española included the five top teams of the 2009 season. At the end of the regular season, the top two of the Conferencia Española acceded directly to the semifinals for the title, and faced the winners of the playoff between wild cards.

Conferencia Española

Conferencia Nacional

Conferencia Hispanica

Play-offs

See also
 LNFA

Liga Nacional de Fútbol Americano
2010 in American football